Aşağı Cürəli (also, Ashagy Dzhurali and Nizhniy Dzhurali)  is a village in the Bilasuvar Rayon of Azerbaijan.

References 

Populated places in Bilasuvar District